Justice Graves may refer to:

Benjamin F. Graves (judge), associate justice of the Michigan Supreme Court
Charles Burleigh Graves, associate justice of the Kansas Supreme Court
James E. Graves Jr., associate justice of the Mississippi Supreme Court
Thomas Graves (judge), associate justice of the Massachusetts Supreme Judicial Court
Waller Washington Graves, associate justice of the Supreme Court of Missouri
William Graves (judge), associate justice of the Kentucky Supreme Court